Trinità is a comune (municipality) in the Province of Cuneo in the Italian region Piedmont, located about  south of Turin and about  northeast of Cuneo.

Trinità borders the following municipalities: Bene Vagienna, Fossano, Magliano Alpi, and Sant'Albano Stura.

Notable people 
 Pietro Miglio, footballer 
 Twins Nete, a sisters duo singers of italian popular music.

References

Cities and towns in Piedmont